Kaplna is a village and municipality in western Slovakia in  Senec District in the Bratislava Region. It is located about ten kilometres (6.25 miles) north-east of Senec on a road connecting Senec with Trnava.

History
Archaeological digs show that the area around Kaplna was first settled around 5000 BC. The first written reference to the village comes from a document signed by the Hungarian king Bela IV in 1244 AD as "Capulna".

The name of the village was derived from a unique wo-tower Catholic church built in Romanesque architecture sometimes in the first half of the eleventh century.  The church walls were not plastered, showing its bright red bricks.  Later, the church was rebuilt in early Gothic style, and after a 1634 fire it has been rebuilt with only one tower. In the eighteenth century the church interior was rebuilt in Baroque style. In 1960, an archaeological dig uncovered the original Romanesque porch and windows.

During the Ottoman invasion the village was abandoned, only to be resettled in the sixteenth century by Croatian colonists. Between 1974 and 1990 the village was a part of Báhoň, after which it attained self-governance.

Culture and Entertainment
Kaplna has a soccer club, which is currently in the middle of the field of Slovakia's sixth division soccer league, Bratislava district. In addition, the mayor is organizing a table tennis tournament each year.

In 2003, Kaplna has founded a folk song festival taking place every September, called Folkovanie v Kaplne. The attendance and number of bands, however, has steadily declined since the first year.

The village also contains a hotel with a restaurant, ice cream shop and Internet cafe.

Demographics
According to the 2011 census, the municipality had 701 inhabitants. 687 of inhabitants were Slovaks and 14 others and unspecified.

See also
 List of municipalities and towns in Slovakia

References

Genealogical resources

The records for genealogical research are available at the state archive "Statny Archiv in Bratislava, Slovakia"

 Roman Catholic church records (births/marriages/deaths): 1703-1903 (parish A)
 Lutheran church records (births/marriages/deaths): 1786-1896 (parish B)

External links

Municipal website
Surnames of living people in Kaplna

Villages and municipalities in Senec District